Three ships of the Holt Line were named Talthybius:

, a cargo liner in service 1912–42
, a Liberty ship in service 1947–54
, a Victory ship in service 1960–71

Ship names